Padang Galo is a village in Duku Pilubang, Sungai Limau, Padang Pariaman regency. Padang Galo has about 300 inhabitants and covers a broad area. In 2009, when an earthquake happened in West Sumatra , many people lost their homes; because of that, until now some of them still live in emergency housing. Besides that, the government also give them some aid such as some food, clothes, and also the money that they used to build their home, roads and bridges that were damaged when the earthquake occurred.

Although the earthquake severely damaged this village, the beautiful nature of this place never changed. It has beautiful river and hills, like when you in Pinjawan hill (hill in Padang Galo) you can see the sea and at night you can see the lights of the ships at that hill, and it is so amazing . This village also has unique culture, like when people in there celebrating “ Maulud Nabi” ( Prophet Muhammad’s birthday) they celebrate it with pray to ALLAH but like singing and they say that “ Badikia” They do badikia at night and in the afternoon they give “Lamang” and “Rice(jamba)” each other .

The other culture is in “Idil Fitri” event, they also do something Unique like”Ratik Patang Mambantai”this activity like pray to ALLAH with keep standing and shake their head left and right, sometime one of them do this thing until they’re not aware and stiff. 

Padang Galo’s people are also know about technology development but they’re also try to defend their culture and their village.

Padang Pariaman Regency